Nassarius cernohorskyi is a species of sea snail, a marine gastropod mollusk in the family Nassariidae, the Nassa mud snails or dog whelks.

Description
The length of the shell attains 8.7 mm.

Distribution
This species occurs in the Pacific Ocean off the Marquesas Islands.

References

 Bouchet, P.; Fontaine, B. (2009). List of new marine species described between 2002–2006. Census of Marine Life.

Nassariidae
Gastropods described in 2005